NSBM may refer to:

 National School of Business Management, a Sri Lankan tertiary institute
 National Socialist black metal, a political philosophy within black metal music that promotes Nazism or similar ideologies
 Nederlandse Stoomboot Maatschappij, a Dutch shipping line later absorbed into Nedlloyd as the Koninklijk Nederlandse Stoomboot Maatschappij (KNSM)
 No sex before marriage
 Northeast School of Botanical Medicine, located in Ithaca, New York